The de Havilland Gyron Junior is a military turbojet engine design of the 1950s developed by the de Havilland Engine Company and later produced by Bristol Siddeley. The Gyron Junior was a scaled-down derivative of the de Havilland Gyron.

Design and development 
The Gyron Junior was a two-fifths flow scale version of the existing Gyron engine. It started as Project Study number 43 in 1954 and the first prototype ran in August 1955.

It powered the Blackburn Buccaneer S.1 twin-engined Naval strike aircraft. The engine was rather unreliable and considered short of thrust. The later Buccaneer S.2 used the more powerful Rolls-Royce Spey engine.

The engine had variable inlet guide vanes, as used on many other engines, necessary for accelerating from idle to high thrust. However, on the Gyron Junior, positioning of the vanes was not reliable and could cause surging which, in turn, could prevent accelerating to higher thrust levels. A possibly unique feature on this engine was valve-controlled cooling air to the turbine blades. The engine had to supply air for the aircraft's boundary layer control system and the resulting thrust loss was unacceptable. To regain the thrust the turbine temperature limit was raised by using turbine blade cooling, selected only with blowing on.

In December 1970 a Buccaneer was lost after one engine surged and failed to accelerate on an overshoot and a week later another aircraft was lost after an uncontained engine failure. This last accident brought to an end the use of Gyron Junior.

Two Gyron Juniors, with afterburners, were also used on the Bristol 188 Mach 2 supersonic research aircraft. The 188 was originally intended to have the Rolls-Royce Avon but the  half ton lighter Gyron Junior was substituted in June 1957. This engine was one of the first with continuously variable thrust up to full reheat; others increased thrust in discrete steps.  The programme was terminated early without achieving the high-speed high-temperature trials that had been intended. Limitations included poor fuel consumption of the Gyron Junior and engine surging. Fuel limitations restricted the time spent at its maximum speed, Mach 1.95, to a few minutes. This was not long enough to achieve the required stabilized temperatures in "thermal soaking" tests.

Variants
Ref: 
Gyron Junior DGJ.1 (or P.S.43)
Gyron Junior DGJ.2 (Mk.101) Interim production stage, used on Buccaneer S. Mk.1.
Gyron Junior DGJ.10Exhibited in 1958 at Farnborough, longer than the DJG.1
Gyron Junior DGJ.10R (or P.S.50) highly augmented afterburning version for the Bristol 188, dry thrust 10,000 lb, wet thrust 14,000 lb (62.3 kN). Added zero stage and two rows of variable stators. Variable nozzle with convergent, convergent/parallel or convergent/divergent configuration depending on reheat selection and aircraft speed. Overall length 
Gyron Junior DGJ.20

Applications 
 Blackburn Buccaneer S.1 
 40 aircraft built

 Bristol 188 
 Only 2 built

 Gloster Javelin
 Testing only, 1 production FAW Mk.1 modified

 Saunders-Roe SR.177 
 Intended application, not built

Engines on display
A de Havilland Gyron Junior is on display at the de Havilland Aircraft Museum, London Colney, Hertfordshire.

A D.H Gyron Junior is on public display at East Midlands Aeropark.

Also on display at the Gatwick Aviation Museum, Charlwood, Surrey, two running engines can also be found here, fitted to Buccaneer S.1, XN923.

Specifications (Gyron Junior DGJ.10)

See also

References

External links

 Photo of DH Gyron Junior
 Photo of Gyron Junior
 Gyron Junior on LeteckeMotory.cz (cs)

Gyron Junior
Bristol aircraft engines
1950s turbojet engines